Bogie is the surname of:

 Cam Bogie (1915-2006), Australian rules footballer
 David Bogie (born 1987), British rally driver
 Ian Bogie (born 1967), British former football player and manager
 Les Bogie (1911–1983), Australian rules footballer
 Malcolm Bogie (born 1939), Scottish former footballer
 Stuart Bogie, American musician

See also
 Robert Bogey (born 1935), French long-distance runner